Mine Tugay (born 28 July 1978) is a Turkish actress. Tugay is a graduate of Istanbul University State Conservatory and has appeared in various plays on stage.

Life and career 
Tugay was born in Konya, where her parents had moved to due to her father's working requirements. She studied at Yeni Levent High School. Her first acting experience was in 1997 with a role in Büyük Kulaklı Küçük Ayı, which went on stage at Masal Gerçek Theatre. In the same, she started taking acting lessons at Müjdat Gezen Arts Center. She was a classmate of fellow actresses Özge Özberk and Özgü Namal. In their class of 15 students, she was among the 13 students who were dismissed due to 'lack of discipline'. In 1998, she enrolled in Istanbul University State Conservatory. After graduating from the conservatory, she started going on stage at Semaver Company. 
 
In 2003, with the help of Işıl Kasapoğlu, she was cast in the adaptation of plays Twelfth Night and Kuşlar Meclisi. In the same year, she had a supporting role in the TV series Gülbeyaz. In 2004, she continued her career in television with a role in Adı Aşk Olsun and had her first cinematic experience with Gönül Yarası. In the same year, again with the help of Işıl Kasapoğlu and Bülent Emin Yarar, she was cast in an adaptation of Mem and Zin.
 
In 2005, she played in the TV series Aşk Her Yaşta. While completing her master's degree in Advanced Acting in Bahçeşehir University, she took part in the series Aliye. In 2006, she got her master's degree with Emre Koyuncuoğlu's was given a role in the play Çok Uzak. Tugay continued her career on television with leading roles in Show TV's series Gülpare and Star TV's series Benden Baba Olmaz. She was cast opposite Haluk Piyes in TRT 1's series Aynadaki Düşman in 2009. In 2011, she portrayed chief commander Suna in Behzat Ç. Bir Ankara Polisiyesi.

She joined the cast of Kanal D's Öyle Bir Geçer Zaman ki in its third season, playing the role of Bahar. Together with Engin Hepileri, Tugay hosted the 2013 Antalya Television Awards. Another breakthrough in her career came with her role in Star TV's popular teen drama Medcezir. After her character was killed off in season one, she announced on Twitter that this was solely the writer's decision to have her character removed from the story. In 2014,  she had a leading role in ATV's series Kalp Hırsızı opposite Kenan Ece, but the series was not popular and concluded after a few episodes. After playing a supporting role Çilek Kokusu and a leading role Paramparça, Tugay portrayed the character of Şeniz Karaçay in Zalim İstanbul between 2019–2020.

Filmography

TV series

Film

Short film

Theatre

Awards and nominations

References

External link
 

1978 births
Turkish stage actresses
Turkish film actresses
Turkish television actresses
Living people